Arefina is a rural locality (a village) in Krasnovishersky District, Perm Krai, Russia. The population was 14 as of 2010. There is 1 street.

Geography 
Arefina is located 54 km southeast of Krasnovishersk (the district's administrative centre) by road. Parshakova is the nearest rural locality.

References 

Rural localities in Krasnovishersky District